Surprise Your Pig: A Tribute to R.E.M. is a tribute album of the songs of R.E.M. released in 1992. The title comes from a misunderstood exchange between Jefferson Holt and Mike Mills.

Track listing
All songs written by Bill Berry, Peter Buck, Mike Mills, and Michael Stipe
"Radio Free Europe" by Just Say No – 3:10
"1,000,000" by Band of Susans – 4:25
"Stumble" by Gumball – 6:19
"We Walk" by Steel Pole Bath Tub – 3:40
"Talk About the Passion" by Samson & The Philistines – 4:07
"Pretty Persuasion" by Jawbreaker – 5:35
"(Don't Go Back To) Rockville" by J Church – 3:40
"Feeling Gravitys Pull" by Phleg Camp – 3:03
"Cant Get There from Here" by The Mr. T Experience – 2:50
"Good Advices" by Flor de Mal – 3:06
"Bandwagon" by The Punch Line – 2:19
"I Believe" by When People Were Shorter and Lived Near the Water – 2:39
"It's the End of the World as We Know It (And I Feel Fine)" by Vic Chesnutt – 4:04
"Get Up" by King Missile – 2:31
"Losing My Religion" by Tesco Vee's Hate Police – 3:05
"Low" by Jawbox – 4:08
"Shiny Happy People" by Mitch Easter – 3:28

Release history

See also
Drive XV: A Tribute to Automatic for the People

External links

Albums produced by Mitch Easter
R.E.M. tribute albums
1992 compilation albums
Alternative rock compilation albums